Francis Blake Delaval may refer to:

 Francis Blake Delaval (1692–1752), naval officer
 Sir Francis Blake Delaval (1727–1771), his son